Hannan and Hannon are Irish surnames.

People
People with the surname Hannan or Hannon include:
 Albert James Hannan (1887–1965), South Australian Crown Solicitor
 Brian Hannon (born 1936), Church of Ireland clergyman
 Chick Hannan (1901–1980), American actor and radio performer
 Chris Hannon (born 1984), American football player
 Daniel Hannan (born 1971), Member of the European Parliament (MEP), British Conservative Party politician
 Dave Hannan (born 1961), Canadian professional hockey player
 Dinny Hannon Denis J. Hannon (1888–1971), Irish Footballer
 Edward J. Hannan (1921–1994), Australian statistician
 Edward Joseph Hannan (1836–1891), Irish priest, founded Hibernian F.C.
 Ezra Hannon, pseudonym used by author best known as Ed McBain
 Fiona Hannan aka Fiona Robinson (born 1969), Australian basketball and handball player
 Geoff Hannan (born 1972), British composer and musician
 George Hannan (1910–2009), Australian politician
 Jerome Daniel Hannan (1896–1965), American prelate of the Roman Catholic Church
 Jim Hannan (born 1940), American baseball player
 Jim Hannan (rugby player) (1864–1905), Welsh international rugby player
 Jimmy Hannan (1934–2019), Australian singer and TV personality 
 Joseph Hannan (1873–1943), Australian politician and trade unionist
 Kemp Hannon (born 1946), American politician, member of the New York State Senate
 Kevin Hannan (1954–2008), American ethnolinguist and Slavicist
 M. A. Hannan (1930–1974), Bangladeshi politician
 Mary Josephine Hannan (c. 1865–c. 1935), medical doctor, first Irishwoman to graduate LRCPI & SI and LM
 Melissa Hannan, Australian pageant winner and TV personality
 Michael Hannan (disambiguation), several people, including
 Michael Hannan (bishop) (1821–1882), Roman Catholic priest and archbishop.
 Michael Hannan (composer) (born 1949), Australian composer, keyboardist, and musicologist
 Michael T. Hannan (born 1943), American sociologist
 Mitch Hannan (born 1994), Australian rules footballer
 Monica Hannan (born 1960), anchorwoman in North Dakota
 Neil Hannon (born 1970), Irish singer with pop group "The Divine Comedy", son of Brian Hannon
 Paddy Hannan, Patrick Hannan (c. 1840–1925), gold prospector of Kalgoorlie, Western Australia
 Pat Hannan (1884–1957), New Zealand rower
 Patrick Hannon (1874-1963), British politician
 Peter Hannan (disambiguation), several people, including
 Peter Hannan (composer) (born 1953), Canadian composer and recorder player
 Peter Hannan (footballer) (1908–1938), Australian rules footballer
 Peter Hannan (producer) (born 1954), television producer, writer, and singer-songwriter
 see also Peter Hanan (1915–2008), New Zealand swimmer
 Philip Hannan (1913–2011), American Roman Catholic archbishop
 Richard Hannon Sr. (born 1945), British horse trainer
 Richard Hannon Jr. (born 1975), British horse trainer
 Sara Hannan (born 1961), American politician
 Scott Hannan (born 1979), professional hockey player in the NHL
 Stephanie Hannon (born 1974), American political operative
 Thomas Hannan (activist) (1950–1991), opera singer and HIV/AIDS activist
 Thomas Hannan (Virginia settler) (1757–1835), American settler and Revolutionary War soldier 
 Tommy Hannan (born 1980), American Olympic swimmer
 Tina Hannan, United Kingdom writer
 William Hannan (1906—1987), Labour Member of Parliament in the United Kingdom
 William Hannon (1879–1950), president of St. Ambrose University

Hannon may also refer to:
 Point Hannon, a sand spit in Hood Canal

See also
 Hanon
 Hanlon
 Hanno

Surnames
Surnames of Irish origin
Surnames of British Isles origin